Eva Matilda Löwstädt-Åström (5 May 1864 – 5 May 1942) was a Swedish painter and graphic artist. Several different dates and years are given for her birth. This one is taken from her tombstone.

Biography 
Eva Matilda Löwstädt was born in Stockholm in 1864. Her father, was a master tailor. Her grandfather, was also a painter and graphic artist. Her sister, Hilma Amalia Löwstädt (better known as Emma Chadwick) also became an artist.

After her primary education, she studied at the Kunsthochschule Tekniska Skolan (now known as the Konstfack) from 1885 to 1886. She also studied etching with Axel Tallberg. From 1887 to 1890, she continued her studies at the Académie Colarossi and the Académie Julian in Paris. This was followed by a three-year stay in Italy. Upon returning to Sweden, she married Ludvig Åström.

She became associated with the Konstnärsförbundets skola, and participated in many of their exhibitions. In the 1890s, she returned to France to visit her sister at the artists' colony in Grez-sur-Loing and would spend much of her life alternating between Stockholm and Paris.
Most of her paintings are landscapes or floral still-lifes, in an Impressionistic style.

Löwstädt-Åström died in Stockholm in 1942.

References

Further reading 
 John Kruse: Svenskt Porträttgalleri XX. Tullberg, Stockholm 1901, pg.184.
 Anna Meister, Carina Rech, Karin Sidén: Grez-sur-Liong. Konst och relationer. Exhibition catalog, Prins Eugens Waldemarsudde, Stockholm 2019, .

External links 

 Works by Löwstädt-Åström in the Nationalmuseum Stockholm

1864 births
1942 deaths
Swedish painters
Swedish landscape painters
Swedish still life painters
Artists from Stockholm